Naso (Sicilian: Nasu) is a town and comune in northeastern Sicily, Italy, administratively part of the Metropolitan City of Messina. It had 4,070 inhabitants in 2011.

History
From https://www.italythisway.com/places/articles/naso-history.php

Early History of Naso

The idea of a “peopled mountain” (see etymology further down) corresponds well with the origins of the village, which certainly date back to the early Middle Ages, and that, according to Carlo Incudine [13], was founded by people who fled from the Arab incursions.

This fear urged the local people (especially from Agatirso and Nasida) to take refuge in high territory towards the first two decades of the ninth century AD. About the origins of it, Giuseppe Buttà (1826-1886), a native of “Naso” and chaplain in the armed services of the Bourbons, wrote:

"[…] The small town of Naso, or 'Castel di Naso,'  as the ancient historians called it, is not very old but it was built on the ruins of the ancient ‘Nasida’, located in a valley on the left bank of the ‘Naso’ River, almost in front of  the present town of ‘Ficarra.’ This town was made famous by the Basilian Abbot Conone Navacita, a very pious man, who lived at the time of Roger II; and there are preserved his relics [St. Conone from “Naso”, in Sicily, was born in the 12th century under King Roger II [1095-1154] and he died, apparently, on 28 March 1236] (...)  He was chosen as the patron saint of the inhabitants of ‘Naso’ [...]” [14]

Naso is located close to Capo d'Orlando, where there was the old “Agathyrsum”, that, according to legend, was founded by Agathirsus, son of Aeolus. Diodorus (90-27 BC) called  it "Agathyrnus":

"This town was built by Agathirsus, son of Aeolus, who gave it his name, as narrated by Diodorus in the sixth book [15], but by Polybius (200-118 BC), and Stephen of Byzantium (6th century AD) it was called ‘Agathirsa’ "[...] [15]. In later times, in fact, when Agathyrsum was destroyed by Muslims, the inhabitants migrated to Nasida (or Naxida), a town situated on the banks of the river Timeton, near the territory of the present “Capo d'Orlando”:

“[…] This territorial contiguity between the two cities, called 'proximae olim' ['sometimes close'] by a late inscription of the 18th century [16] is perhaps the most convincing evidence in favour of the identification of Agatyrsum with Capo d'Orlando. Nasida also was destroyed by the Saracens, and the survivors founded a new town (today “Naso”), on a fortified hill  [...]" [17].

The Norman Period

In Norman times, the name appears in the 11th century (in 1082) as "Nasa". In the document the Count Roger (1031-1101) gave some property to the Church of Traina, including "Nasa": “I gave and grant the Church of Traina...the names of towns and castles are these: Messana, Raymecla, Milatium, Tauromeuium, Militellum, Synagra, Ficarra, Fetelia, Nasa, Sanagia, Galath" [19].

The name "Nasa" appears again in 1094 when Count Roger gave half of the castle called 'Nasa' to the Abbey of St. Bartholomew:

"I Roger give the monastery of St. Bartholomew situated in Lipari, headed by the Venerable Abbot Ambrose, the Castle called 'Tatalia' with all its appurtenances and half of the castle called 'Nasa' with all its appurtenances and a hundred peasants" [20].

Then the town was granted to the Barresi (1134), and then it was ruled by numerous powerful feudal families such as the Alagona.

Entering the Middle Ages in Naso - a time of many owners!

Buttà wrote that "[…] Naso suffered a lot for the baronial domain." In fact, the history of Naso was characterized by tumultuous events, which were summarized briefly but effectively in the 19th century by V. Castelli, who wrote that:

"[...] The County of Naso was governed in 1112 by Goffredo di Naso, and before 1094 by the Diocese of Patti. Goffredo di Naso was succeeded by Gualtieri di Guantes, and then by Abbo Barresi. Giovanni Barresi, partisan of the Anjou, was stripped of it by King Frederick II of Aragon (1272-1337), who gave it to Filianello Pisano, and then to Blasco of Alagona (died 1355), his Lieutenant General.

Naso fell into the hands of King Louis of Naples (1320-1362) in 1350 and it was granted to Nicholas Cesareo. King Martin I (1376-1409) in 1392 invested it in Bartolomeo d'Alagona, Count of Cammarata. It then passed into the hands of Raymond de Xamar, the Royal Chamberlain to King Martin (…) King Alfonso (1396-1458) gave it to Bernard Centelles in 1406.

During the centuries it has belonged to different feudatories: Blascos, Artale Alagona, Cadornas, Aragonas and Ventimiglias who made of it a county in 1572. It entered then into the possession of Francis Starrabba in 1589, giving in exchange to the Ventimiglia the fiefs of Regiovanni on October 17, 1583. It was then purchased by Carlo Ventimiglia Marquis of Geraci [1520-1592] in 1591, who sold it to Jerome Joppolo Ponz de Leon in 1595. Naso was devastated by earthquakes several times; those most memorable were in January 1693, when Naso was nearly destroyed [23].

Because of the economic needs of Count Antonio Joppolo Ventimiglia it next fell into the hands of Stefano Cibo. The county was later owned by Flavia Cibo La Rocca, who was the wife of Prince Girolamo Cottone (...) then on June 4, 1729 Giuseppa Joppolo Ventimiglia was invested in this county (…) who married Prince Diego Sandoval [...]" [18].

Later the town passed to Carlo Ventimiglia, Marquis of Geraci, Knight of St. James and magistrate of Palermo, under whose dominion the barony was changed into a county. The feud of Naso was later sold to the Grimaldis, and then it was repurchased by Joan and her husband Charles, and finally, after the death of Charles, it was traded by Joan in Starrabba.

Then the territory of Naso was ruled by the La Rocca Cibo (1609-1620) and later by the Cottone (1620-1660) [21].

From the 18th Century onwards in Naso

In the 18th century, the county was governed by Giovan Diego of the Sandoval, who was guilty of abuse of power and violence against his poor citizens [22]. In 1788 it became a State town on order of Ferdinand IV.

It's worthy of note that in 1823 another earthquake occurred in this region. Niccolò Maggiore told that in Naso "the building of the poor, the monastery, the church of San Pietro, church of the souls of purgatory and the Cathedral collapsed, some in full, some in large part" [24].

The crisis of the town between the 19th and 20th century was also due, as with the other cities of Sicily, by the effects of large-scale emigration. Today the small town has economic activities related to agribusiness and of course to tourism.

Origins of the name Naso

From https://www.italythisway.com/places/articles/naso-history.php

From 1545: “[…] 'Neso' now known as Naso [Nose], so called from ‘Nesia’, a region near Mount Etna, is located four miles from the sea (...) At close range eastward there is a shrine called ‘Santa Maria Nasida’ [...]” [3].

Two centuries later, in 1723, we read: “[...] 'Neso' now called ‘Naso’ [Nose], so called from ‘Nesia’, is an area four miles from the promontory that we call 'Capo d'Orlando' (...) At close range to the east there is a shrine called ‘Santa Maria di Nasida’ [...]” [4]
With the short phrases that introduce this page Berosus, in the 16th century, and G.B. Caruso (with some slight variant) in the early 18th century, described the ancient town of Naso. According to both Berosus and Caruso it was formerly called "Nesus," which later became "Nasus".

In practice, Berosus and Caruso had already laid the premises for the etymology of the town, that to this day is always derived from the Greek word "Nesos", or "island", meaning "a secluded spot."

The great linguist Gerald Rohlfs "[...] defended the etymology of the local historians, that ‘Nasus’ (Nesus) derives from the Greek Doric 'Nasos' or from the Ionic-Attic ‘Nesos’ (island). This etymology, however, is not sufficiently supported by the documents, because the form 'Nesus' appears to be due to an etymological conjecture [5]. More likely, 'Naso' is derived from the Latin 'nasus' (nose), in the sense of 'tip', 'end'[...]" [6].

The clear impression that "Naso" derives from Latin and not from Greek is also expressed by Carlo Battisti, who wrote that some names were interpreted by Rohlfs as deriving from  Greek, while instead they were "from Latin stem, with the adjectival suffix in '-icus', as 'nasus-nar-ica' and 'avis-av-ica'" [7].

Having established that "Naso" would seem to derive from Latin and not from  Greek, then one wonders why there is this alternation between "N-[e]-so" and "N- [a]-so." A possible explanation could be that this linguistic phenomenon derives from the phonetic system of a language, or from the local languages.

As was well explained by Rodney Sampson, often in the dialects of Southern Italy, when the vowel / a / is next to a nasal consonant / m, n /, it tends to become / e /: “In various Apulian dialects of the coastal area to the south and especially to the north of Bari, stressed /a/ evolves in a special way when adjacent to a nasal environment: 'N-a-sum' > 'N-e-so'” [8].

In Latin, for example, this phenomenon is normal, and this peculiar phonetic phenomenon is clearly visible in a Neo-Latin language such as French, where from Latin "Nasum" derives the word "N-e-z" [Nose] [9].

However, this "victory" of Latin over Greek is only a "half victory" because, apparently, in ancient times also the Greek word "Nesos" did not mean "island", but sometimes cape and rock overang: “[...] Something like 'promontory', or ‘projecting spit’ (...) would have been the original meaning of 'Nesos' (...) Franz Bopp (...) approached the Greek word [Nesos] to Sanskrit 'nasa' and Latin 'nasus' [...]" [10]. In fact, Bopp wrote that: "Perhaps the Greek word ‘Nesos’ means 'nose' and 'cape'" [11].

Finally, another proof that "Nesos" can have relations with the concept of "hump" and even "mountain" is emphasized by  observations in "Classics and Oriental Studies", in which, through a series of examples between "plain" and "mountain", one concludes that "Nesos-Nasos reveals the inner meaning of 'mountain', and in this specific case of a 'peopled mountain'" [12].

In conclusion, the etymology of “Naso” is not properly "island", as it is commonly repeated, but simply  "nose", or "hump" and therefore the significance of the city would be what the name says.

See also Naso for tourist guide and travel information.

People
 Conon of Naso (1139–1236)
 Lady Gaga's paternal great-grandparents immigrated from Naso, Italy to New York, United States in 1904.

References

3. See Berosi Sacerdotis Chaldaici Antiquitatum Libri Quinque”, Anversa, 1545: “Nesus, nunc Nasus, a Nesia regione iuxta Aetnam, milia quatuor a mari seiunctum (...) Est ad Orientem aedicula parum distans, quae Sancta Maria Nasida nuncupatur”

4. See Johannis Baptistae Carusii [Giovan Battista Caruso], “Bibliotheca Historica Regni Siciliae, Panormi [Palermo], 1723, p. 26: “Nesus, nunc Nasus a Nesia regione, milia quatuor a promontorio quod 'Capo d'Orlando' nostri vocant (…) cui vicina aedicula antiqua Orientem versus quo Sancta Maria Nasida nuncupatur”

5. see G. Alessio [“Rendiconti dell'Istituto Lombardo”, LXXVII, 132, 140 n.2; LXXVII 696 ff.

6. See, “Bollettino del Centro di Studi filologici e linguistici siciliani”, 1956, No. 4, p. 337

7. See Carlo Battisti, “Sostrati e parastrati nell'Italia preistorica”, Florence, Le Monnier, 1959, p. 69

8. Vedi Rodney Sampson, “Nasal vowel evolution in Romance”, Oxford University Press, 1999, p. 244

9. See "Archiv für das Studium der neueren Sprachen, 1936, Vol. 169, p. 310

10. See “Università di Perugia. Dipartimento di scienze storiche dell'antichità”, “Geographia antiqua”, Giunti, 2004, p. 4

11. See Francisco Bopp," Glossarium Sanscritum", Berolini, 1847, p. 194

12. See “Università di Pisa. Istituto di Archeologia e storia antica”, “Studi classici e orientali”, Vol 19, p. 252

13. “La città di Naso illustrata”, Napoli, De Angelis, 1882. New Ed. “Naso Illustrata. Storia di una città municipale”. A cura di G. Buttà, Milano, Giuffrè, 1975

14. See G. Buttà, “Edoardo e Rosolina o le conseguenze del 1861”, Brindisi, Trabant, 2011, p. 287 footnote 2

15. Fazello, 1817, 536

16. See C. Incudine, 1975, p. 11

17. See“Rivista storica dell'antichità”, Vol 11–12, Pàtron Editore, 1982, p . 55

18. See V. Castelli, “Fasti di Sicilia”[“The Past Glories of Sicily”], Messina, 1820, Vol II, p. 317

19. See R. Starrabba, “Contributo allo studio della diplomatica siciliana dei tempi Normanni. Diplomi di fondazione delle chiese episcopali di Sicilia” (1082-1093) in “Archivio storico siciliano”, 1893, p. 47

20. The document can be read in Shlomo Simonsohn, who so  presents it: “Duke Roger confirms to St. Bartholomew on Lipari various donations including that of Guillelmus Maloseporarius of a Jew and his children in Naso” ( See Shlomo Simonsohn. “The Jews in Sicily”, Brill, 1997, Vol. I, p. 1094, doc. 167).

21. See F. Paolino, “Architetture religiose a Messina e nel suo territorio fra Controriforma e tardorinascimento”, 1995, p. 141

22. See G. Battaglia," Guide of Sicily”, 1904, p . 103

23. G. Battaglia, p. 151

24. See N. Maggiore, “Compendio della storia di Sicilia”, 1840, p. 310

Attractions
The most important monuments of the village are the Baroque Mother Church, dedicated to the SS Apostoli Filippo and Giordano, includes impressive works of art created in the 16th century; the Church of Santissimo Salvatore, built in the 16th century, includes precious paintings and frescos dating back to the 17th century; the Church of Santa Maria del Gesù, built in the 15th century; the Sacred Art Maueum, located in the “Catacombs of San Cono”, was opened to the public in May 2002 with the aim to preserve and promote the knowledge of the historical and artistic heritage collected from local churches.

Municipalities of the Metropolitan City of Messina